Cape Hoadley is a prominent rock coastal outcrop forming the west portal of the valley occupied by Scott Glacier in East Antarctica. It was discovered by the Western Base Party of the Australasian Antarctic Expedition under Mawson in November 1912, and named by him for C.A. Hoadley, a geologist with the party.

References

Headlands of Queen Mary Land